Brendan Larkin (born 1943) is an Irish retired Gaelic footballer who played as a centre-back for the Cork senior football team.

Born in Douglas, Cork, Larkin first played competitive football in his youth. He arrived on the inter-county scene at the age of seventeen when he first linked up with the Cork minor team, before later joining the under-21 side. He joined the senior panel during the 1964 championship and played for just one season.

At club level Larkin  played with Douglas.

Honours

Team

Cork
Munster Under-21 Football Championship (1): 1963 (sub)
All-Ireland Minor Football Championship (1): 1961
Munster Minor Football Championship (2): 1960, 1961

References

1943 births
Living people
Douglas Gaelic footballers
Douglas hurlers
Cork inter-county Gaelic footballers